The Silent Raid is a 1962 Dutch war film directed by Paul Rotha. It shows a true story from World War II: the raid on Leeuwarden prison of December 8, 1944. Without firing a shot, Dutch resistance members disguised as German SD and their prisoners enter the prison, free 39 prisoners and vanish into the city. The Germans were unable to find any of the organizers or escapees.

It was entered into the 3rd Moscow International Film Festival. The film was one of the most successful in the Netherlands (1,474,000 tickets sold). The scenario was written by Loe de Jong.

Cast
 Ab Abspoel as PTT-monteur Jan
 Henk Admiraal as Hein de Zwijger
 Chris Baay as Vos
 Hetty Beck as Eppie's mother
 Yoka Berretty as Mies
 Kees Brusse
 Bernard Droog
 Piet Römer
 Rob de Vries

References

External links
 

1962 films
1960s Dutch-language films
Dutch black-and-white films
Dutch World War II films
Films directed by Paul Rotha
Films about Dutch resistance